The Beastars anime series takes place in a world of modern, civilized, anthropomorphic animals with a cultural divide between carnivores and herbivores. The series takes its name from the in-universe rank of Beastar, an individual of great talent, service, and notoriety. The story focuses on the gray wolf Legoshi as he deals with his attraction to the rabbit Haru.

In the 10th issue of 2019 of Weekly Shōnen Champion, it was announced that Beastars would get an anime television series adaptation animated by CG studio Orange. Shin'ichi Matsumi directed the series, with Nanami Higuchi handling series composition, Nao Ootsu designing the characters, and Satoru Kōsaki composing the series' music. The series aired from October 10 to December 26, 2019 and aired on Fuji TV's +Ultra anime programming block and other channels. The first season was 12 episodes in total, with the Netflix release outside of Japan on March 13, 2020. At the conclusion of the TV broadcast, a second season was announced. Animation studio Orange returned to produce the second season, which aired from January 7 to March 25, 2021.

ALI performed the series' opening theme song "Wild side", while Yurika performed the series' ending theme songs "Le zoo" (ep. 2, 5, 8 and 9), "Sleeping instinct" (ep. 3, 7 and 10), "Marble" (ep. 4, 6 and 11) and "Floating Story on the Moon" (ep. 12). Season 1 of Beastars was released on March 13, 2020 on Netflix outside of Japan. Its second season was released internationally on the streaming service on July 15, 2021.

On July 20, 2021, studio Orange and Netflix Japan announced that the anime series would be receiving a third and final season. It is set to premiere on Netflix in 2024.

Series overview

Episode list

Season 1 (2019)

Season 2 (2021)

Notes

References

External links
 
 at Netflix

Beastars